Common sneezeweed is a common name for several plants and may refer to:

Centipeda cunninghamii, native to Australia
Helenium autumnale, native to North America